Rondo Daszyńskiego is a station on the central part of Line M2 of the Warsaw Metro.

The station fully opened for passenger use on 8 March 2015 as the western terminus of the inaugural stretch of Line M2 between Rondo Daszyńskiego and Dworzec Wileński. It was designed by Polish architect Andrzej M. Chołdzyński and constructed by Metroprojekt. Murals were created by Wojciech Fangor, artist of the Polish School of Posters.

The station is located just west of Rondo Daszyńskiego (Daszyński Roundabout), named in honor of Ignacy Daszyński.

Construction of the station was made difficult by adverse hydrological conditions.

Gallery

References

External links
Detailed map of  Line M2 from official Warsaw Metro site
Detailed plan of Rondo Daszyńskiego station from official Warsaw Metro site

Railway stations in Poland opened in 2015
Line 2 (Warsaw Metro) stations
Wola